Mesogobius nigronotatus is a species of gobiid fish native to the  Caspian Sea. It is only known from a couple of samples, from Kazakhstan and the southern part of the sea; the type material has been lost. It is suspected to be the same taxon as that known as Mesogobius nonultimus.

The length of the fish was  TL.

References

Mesogobius
Fish of the Caspian Sea
Fish of Asia
Fish described in 1877
Endemic fauna of the Caspian Sea
Taxa named by Karl Kessler